This is a list of binomial names in the fungi genus Meliola (in the family of Meliolaceae), with just accepted species and not including synonyms.

Outline of Fungi and fungus-like taxa lists up to 1700 species (in 2020).
Which are listed by Species Fungorum;

A

Meliola abdulkalamii 
Meliola abietis 
Meliola abraensis 
Meliola abrahamii 
Meliola abri 
Meliola abrupta 
Meliola acaciae 
Meliola acaciae-confusae 
Meliola acaciarum 
Meliola acaciicola 
Meliola acalyphicola 
Meliola acamptinga 
Meliola acanthacearum 
Meliola acanthopanacis 
Meliola aceris 
Meliola achudemiae 
Meliola achyrospermi 
Meliola acridocarpi 
Meliola acristae 
Meliola acrotricha 
Meliola actephilae 
Meliola actinodaphneicola 
Meliola actinodaphnes 
Meliola acunae 
Meliola acutiseta 
Meliola adenantherae 
Meliola adenanthericola 
Meliola adunciseta 
Meliola aegiphilae 
Meliola aequatoriensis 
Meliola aethiops 
Meliola affinis 
Meliola africana 
Meliola aganopes 
Meliola agauriae 
Meliola agavicola 
Meliola agelaeicola 
Meliola aglaiae 
Meliola aglaiae-edulis 
Meliola aglaiicola 
Meliola aglaina 
Meliola agnolae-mariae 
Meliola agonandrae 
Meliola agrostistachydis 
Meliola ailanthi 
Meliola ailanthicola 
Meliola alangii 
Meliola alatae 
Meliola albiziae 
Meliola albiziae-granulosae 
Meliola albiziae-polyanthae 
Meliola alchorneicola 
Meliola alectryonis 
Meliola alibertiae 
Meliola aliena 
Meliola allophyli 
Meliola allophyli-concanici 
Meliola allophyligena 
Meliola allophyli-serrulati 
Meliola allophylorum 
Meliola alniphylli 
Meliola alocasiae 
Meliola alstoniae 
Meliola alstoniae-comptonii 
Meliola alstoniicola 
Meliola alternipes 
Meliola altingiae 
Meliola altissimae 
Meliola alyxiae 
Meliola alyxiicola 
Meliola amadelpha 
Meliola amaniensis 
Meliola amaraliae 
Meliola ambigua 
Meliola amboinensis 
Meliola amerimni 
Meliola amomicola 
Meliola amoorae 
Meliola amphigena 
Meliola amphitricha 
Meliola amyridis 
Meliola anacardii 
Meliola anacolosae 
Meliola anceps 
Meliola ancistrocladi 
Meliola andamanica 
Meliola andina 
Meliola andirae 
Meliola andirae-humilis 
Meliola andropogonis 
Meliola anfracta 
Meliola angiopteridis 
Meliola angusta 
Meliola angustispora 
Meliola anisomelis 
Meliola anisophylleae 
Meliola annonacearum 
Meliola annonae 
Meliola anodendri 
Meliola anodendricola 
Meliola anthospermi 
Meliola antioquensis 
Meliola apayaoensis 
Meliola aphanamixidis 
Meliola apodytis 
Meliola aporusae 
Meliola aracearum 
Meliola araliae 
Meliola araliicola 
Meliola arcuata 
Meliola ardigoosii 
Meliola ardisiae 
Meliola ardisiicola 
Meliola ardisiigena 
Meliola argomuellerae 
Meliola argyreiae 
Meliola arippaensis 
Meliola ariquemensis 
Meliola aristata 
Meliola aristidae 
Meliola aristolochiae 
Meliola aristolochiae-tagalae 
Meliola aristolochigena 
Meliola aristolochiicola 
Meliola arkevermae 
Meliola arnoldii 
Meliola arrabidaeae 
Meliola artabotrydicola 
Meliola artabotrydis 
Meliola artocarpi 
Meliola arundinis 
Meliola asclepiadacearum 
Meliola asperipoda 
Meliola atalantiae 
Meliola atalayae 
Meliola aterrima 
Meliola atkinsonii 
Meliola atricapilla 
Meliola atrovelutina 
Meliola attayarica 
Meliola atylosiae 
Meliola aucoumeae 
Meliola australis 
Meliola austro-americana 
Meliola autumnalis 
Meliola azimae

B

Meliola baccharidis 
Meliola bactridis 
Meliola baileyi 
Meliola baisseae 
Meliola bakeri 
Meliola balakrishnanii 
Meliola balanitis 
Meliola balansae 
Meliola bambusae 
Meliola bambusicola 
Meliola banahaensis 
Meliola banarae 
Meliola banasuranii 
Meliola bangalorensis 
Meliola banguiensis 
Meliola banksiae 
Meliola banosensis 
Meliola bantamensis 
Meliola baphiae-nitidae 
Meliola baphiae-polygalaceae 
Meliola barleriae 
Meliola barringtoniae 
Meliola barringtoniicola 
Meliola barsamae 
Meliola bataanensis 
Meliola batangasensis 
Meliola bauhiniae 
Meliola bauhiniae-phoeniceae 
Meliola bauhiniicola 
Meliola beebei 
Meliola begoniae 
Meliola behniae 
Meliola beilschmiediae 
Meliola beilschmiediicola 
Meliola beloperonis 
Meliola berliniae 
Meliola bersamae 
Meliola besleriae 
Meliola bhesae 
Meliola bhimashankarensis 
Meliola bicornis 
Meliola bidentata 
Meliola biegensis 
Meliola bifida 
Meliola bignoniacearum 
Meliola biparasitica 
Meliola biserrata 
Meliola bisgoeppertiae 
Meliola bissei 
Meliola bixae 
Meliola blepharidis  
Meliola bodoquenensis 
Meliola boedijniana 
Meliola boerlagiodendriae 
Meliola bonamiae 
Meliola bonaoensis 
Meliola bonarii 
Meliola bonetii 
Meliola boninensis 
Meliola borbonicae 
Meliola borinquena 
Meliola borneensis 
Meliola bosei 
Meliola bouchardatiae 
Meliola bougheyana 
Meliola brachycera 
Meliola brachyodonta 
Meliola brachypoda 
Meliola brandisiae 
Meliola brassaiopsidis 
Meliola brevidentata 
Meliola brevispora 
Meliola brideliae 
Meliola brideliicola 
Meliola brillantaisiae 
Meliola brisbanensis 
Meliola brooksii 
Meliola bruguierae 
Meliola bryae 
Meliola buchananiae 
Meliola buchananiicola 
Meliola buchenaviae 
Meliola bucklandiae 
Meliola bumeliae 
Meliola bunyorensis 
Meliola burgosensis 
Meliola burseracearum 
Meliola busogensis 
Meliola bussei 
Meliola buteae 
Meliola butyrospermi 
Meliola buxaduarii 
Meliola buxi 
Meliola buxicola 
Meliola bwaniana 
Meliola byrsonimae 
Meliola byrsonimicola 
Meliola byrsonimina

C

Meliola cabellensis 
Meliola cadambae 
Meliola cadigensis 
Meliola caesalpiniae 
Meliola caesalpiniicola 
Meliola calami 
Meliola calatheae 
Meliola calatheicola 
Meliola callicarpae 
Meliola callicarpicola 
Meliola callosperma 
Meliola calochaeta 
Meliola calopogonii 
Meliola calpidiae 
Meliola calycopteridis 
Meliola camaragibeicola 
Meliola camelliae 
Meliola camelliicola 
Meliola campanulacearum 
Meliola campylopoda 
Meliola campylotricha 
Meliola canangae 
Meliola canarii 
Meliola canarii-albi 
Meliola canariifolia 
Meliola canavaliae 
Meliola canellae 
Meliola canfacotensis 
Meliola cannonicola 
Meliola cannonii 
Meliola cansjerae 
Meliola cansjericola 
Meliola cantareirensis 
Meliola canthii-angustifolii 
Meliola canthiicola 
Meliola canthiigena 
Meliola capensis 
Meliola capilligera 
Meliola capillipedii 
Meliola capitati 
Meliola capparicola 
Meliola capparis 
Meliola capsicicola 
Meliola caput-medusae 
Meliola carapae 
Meliola carbonacea 
Meliola cardiospermi 
Meliola careyae 
Meliola cariappae 
Meliola caricis 
Meliola carissae 
Meliola carludovicae 
Meliola carolinensis 
Meliola carpolobiae 
Meliola carpolobiicola 
Meliola carvalhoi 
Meliola caryotae 
Meliola caseariae 
Meliola caseariae-arboreae 
Meliola caseariae-guianensis 
Meliola caseariicola 
Meliola cassiae-ferrugineae 
Meliola cassiae-fistulae 
Meliola cassiifolii 
Meliola cassythae 
Meliola castaneifoliae 
Meliola castanha 
Meliola castanopsidicola 
Meliola castanopsidis 
Meliola castanopsina 
Meliola castelae 
Meliola castlerockensis 
Meliola catherinensis 
Meliola catubigensis 
Meliola cauveriana 
Meliola cavitensis 
Meliola caxangaensis 
Meliola caymanensis 
Meliola cayratiae 
Meliola celastracearum 
Meliola celastrigena 
Meliola celtidicola 
Meliola celtidis 
Meliola celtidum 
Meliola centellae 
Meliola ceratopetali 
Meliola ceriopis 
Meliola ceropegia 
Meliola cestri 
Meliola cestricola 
Meliola cestri-macrophylli 
Meliola chaetachmes 
Meliola chaetochloae 
Meliola chagres 
Meliola chamaecristae 
Meliola chamissoae 
Meliola champereiae 
Meliola chandleri 
Meliola chandolensis 
Meliola chandrasekharanii 
Meliola chasaliae 
Meliola chassaliicola 
Meliola chelonanthi 
Meliola chenniana 
Meliola chilensis 
Meliola chilocarpi 
Meliola chloristylidis 
Meliola chlorophorae 
Meliola cholakadensis 
Meliola chorizandrae 
Meliola chorleyi 
Meliola chrysobalanacearum 
Meliola chukrasiae 
Meliola chukrasiicola 
Meliola cibaoensis 
Meliola ciferrii 
Meliola cinnamodendri 
Meliola cinnamomi 
Meliola cipadessae 
Meliola cissampeli 
Meliola cissampelicola 
Meliola cissi 
Meliola cissi-antarcticae 
Meliola cissi-caesiae 
Meliola cissi-productae 
Meliola cissi-repandae 
Meliola cissi-rhombifoliae 
Meliola citharexyli 
Meliola citricola 
Meliola citri-maximae 
Meliola citronellae 
Meliola cladacantha 
Meliola cladophaga 
Meliola cladophila 
Meliola clausenae 
Meliola clausenigena 
Meliola clavatispora 
Meliola clavulata 
Meliola cleistopholidis 
Meliola clerodendri 
Meliola clerodendricola 
Meliola clerodendri-infortunati 
Meliola clitoriae 
Meliola clutiae 
Meliola cnestidis 
Meliola coccolobae-nodosae 
Meliola coccolobis 
Meliola cochlospermifolii 
Meliola coffeae 
Meliola cogniauxiae 
Meliola coilicosa 
Meliola colae-simiarum 
Meliola colladoi 
Meliola colletiae 
Meliola colliguajae 
Meliola colombiensis 
Meliola colubrinicola 
Meliola columneae 
Meliola combinans 
Meliola commixta 
Meliola comptonellae 
Meliola condaliae 
Meliola conferta 
Meliola congoensis 
Meliola conica 
Meliola conigera 
Meliola connari 
Meliola connaricola 
Meliola consocia 
Meliola constipata 
Meliola contigua 
Meliola contorta 
Meliola convallata 
Meliola cookeana 
Meliola coorgiana 
Meliola copaiferae 
Meliola corallina 
Meliola corazoyensis 
Meliola cordiae-rufescentis 
Meliola cordiicola 
Meliola coreopsidis 
Meliola couthoviae 
Meliola cranei 
Meliola craterispermi 
Meliola crenata 
Meliola crenatissima 
Meliola crenatofurcata 
Meliola crescentiae 
Meliola cristata 
Meliola crotonicola 
Meliola crotonis-macrostachydis 
Meliola crotonis-malabarici 
Meliola crotonis-nigritani 
Meliola crucifera 
Meliola cryptica 
Meliola cryptocaryae 
Meliola cryptocaryicola 
Meliola cubitella 
Meliola cucurbitacearum 
Meliola culebrensis 
Meliola cumbrensis 
Meliola cunoniae 
Meliola cupaniae-majoris 
Meliola cupaniicola 
Meliola curviseta 
Meliola cuscutae 
Meliola cyathocalycis 
Meliola cyathodis 
Meliola cybianthis 
Meliola cyclantherae 
Meliola cycleae 
Meliola cyclobalanopsina 
Meliola cydistae 
Meliola cylindrophora 
Meliola cylindropoda 
Meliola cymbopogonis 
Meliola cynanchi 
Meliola cyperacearum 
Meliola cyrillacearum 
Meliola cyrtochaeta

D

Meliola dactylopoda 
Meliola dalbergiae 
Meliola dalechampiae 
Meliola dallasica 
Meliola danertii 
Meliola danielliae 
Meliola daphniphyllicola 
Meliola darwiniana 
Meliola dasiana 
Meliola daviesii 
Meliola decidua 
Meliola decora 
Meliola deformis 
Meliola dehradunensis 
Meliola deinbolliae 
Meliola delae 
Meliola delicatula 
Meliola dendropemonis 
Meliola dendrophthoicola 
Meliola dendroseta 
Meliola dendrotrophicola 
Meliola densa 
Meliola denticulata 
Meliola dentifera 
Meliola depressula 
Meliola derridis 
Meliola desmodii 
Meliola desmodiicola 
Meliola desmodii-heterocarpi 
Meliola desmodii-laxiflori 
Meliola desmodii-motorii 
Meliola desmodii-pulchelli 
Meliola desmodii-triangularis 
Meliola desmodii-triquetri 
Meliola desmodii-velutini 
Meliola desmonci 
Meliola devikulamensis 
Meliola dichapetali 
Meliola dichotoma 
Meliola dicranochaeta 
Meliola didymopanacis 
Meliola dieffenbachiae 
Meliola digoana 
Meliola dilcheri 
Meliola dimidiatae 
Meliola dimocarpi 
Meliola dimorphochaeta 
Meliola dioicae 
Meliola dioscoreacearum 
Meliola dioscoreae 
Meliola dioscoreicola 
Meliola dioscoreigena 
Meliola diospyri 
Meliola diospyri-buxifoliae 
Meliola diospyricola 
Meliola diospyri-pentamerae 
Meliola dipholidis 
Meliola diphysae 
Meliola diplochaeta 
Meliola dipterygicola 
Meliola disciseta 
Meliola discocalycis 
Meliola dissotidis 
Meliola distictidis 
Meliola dognyensis 
Meliola doidgeae 
Meliola dolabrata 
Meliola dolichi 
Meliola domingensis 
Meliola dorsteniae 
Meliola doryphorae 
Meliola dracaenae 
Meliola dracaenae-terniflorae 
Meliola dracaenicola 
Meliola drepanochaeta 
Meliola drypeticola 
Meliola duabangae 
Meliola duggenae 
Meliola dummeri 
Meliola durantae 
Meliola durionis 
Meliola dysoxyli 
Meliola dysoxyli-andamanensis 
Meliola dysoxylicola 
Meliola dysoxyligena 
Meliola dysoxyli-malabarici 
Meliola dysoxylina 
Meliola dysoxyli-nitidi

E

Meliola earleana 
Meliola earlii 
Meliola ebeni 
Meliola echitis 
Meliola ecuadorensis 
Meliola edanoana 
Meliola effusa 
Meliola ehretiae 
Meliola ehretiicola 
Meliola ekebergiae 
Meliola ekmaniana 
Meliola elaeagni 
Meliola elaeidis 
Meliola elaeocarpi 
Meliola elaeocarpicola 
Meliola elattostachydis 
Meliola elephantopodis 
Meliola ellertoniae 
Meliola ellipanthi 
Meliola ellisii 
Meliola elmeri 
Meliola elodea 
Meliola emespatilii 
Meliola emmenospermatis 
Meliola englerinae 
Meliola entadae 
Meliola entadicola 
Meliola entebbeensis 
Meliola epithematis 
Meliola epiviscum 
Meliola erioglossi 
Meliola eriolaenicola 
Meliola eriophora 
Meliola eriosemae 
Meliola erithalidis 
Meliola erumeliensis 
Meliola ervatamiae 
Meliola erycibes 
Meliola erycibes-paniculatae 
Meliola erycibicola 
Meliola erythrinae 
Meliola erythrinae-micropterycis 
Meliola erythrinicola 
Meliola erythropali 
Meliola erythrophlei 
Meliola erythrophloeicola 
Meliola erythroxylicola 
Meliola erythroxylifoliae 
Meliola eucalypti 
Meliola euchrestae 
Meliola eucleae 
Meliola eugeniae 
Meliola eugeniae-calophylloidis 
Meliola eugeniae-jamboloidis 
Meliola eugeniae-monticolae 
Meliola eugeniae-stocksii 
Meliola eugeniicola 
Meliola euodiae 
Meliola euodiicola 
Meliola euonymi 
Meliola euonymicola 
Meliola euopla 
Meliola eupatorii 
Meliola euphorbiae 
Meliola evanida 
Meliola evansii 
Meliola eveae 
Meliola exaci 
Meliola exacigena 
Meliola excoecariae 
Meliola excoecariicola 
Meliola exocarpi

F

Meliola fabri 
Meliola fagacearum 
Meliola fagarae 
Meliola fagarae-martinicensis 
Meliola fagarae-nitidae 
Meliola fagraeae 
Meliola fahrenheitiae 
Meliola falcata 
Meliola falcatiseta 
Meliola fasciculiseta 
Meliola fatsiae 
Meliola feretiae 
Meliola ferrugineae 
Meliola fici 
Meliola ficicola 
Meliola ficigena 
Meliola fici-globosae 
Meliola filicii 
Meliola filiciicola 
Meliola flacourtiacearum 
Meliola flemingiae 
Meliola flemingiicola 
Meliola floridensis 
Meliola forbesii 
Meliola formosa 
Meliola formosensis 
Meliola forsteroniae 
Meliola fragrans 
Meliola francevilleana 
Meliola franciscana 
Meliola fraserae 
Meliola fructicola 
Meliola fructicosae 
Meliola frutescentis 
Meliola funerea 
Meliola funtumiae 
Meliola furcata 
Meliola furcillata 
Meliola fuscidula

G

Meliola gaillardiana 
Meliola galeariae 
Meliola galipeae 
Meliola galopinae 
Meliola gamblei 
Meliola gamsii 
Meliola ganglifera 
Meliola ganophyni 
Meliola garciniae 
Meliola garciniicola 
Meliola garciniigena 
Meliola gardneriae 
Meliola garhwalensis 
Meliola garryae 
Meliola garugae 
Meliola geissaspidis 
Meliola gemellipoda 
Meliola geniculata 
Meliola gersoppaensis 
Meliola gesneriae 
Meliola ghesquierei 
Meliola glanduliferae 
Meliola glaziovii 
Meliola gleditsiae 
Meliola gliricidiae 
Meliola gliricidiicola 
Meliola glochidii 
Meliola glochidiicola 
Meliola glochidiifolia 
Meliola glutae 
Meliola gluticola 
Meliola glycosmidis 
Meliola gnathonella 
Meliola gneti 
Meliola gneticola 
Meliola goianensis 
Meliola golaensis 
Meliola gomphandrae 
Meliola goniothalamigena 
Meliola gonzalaguniae 
Meliola gooseana 
Meliola goosii 
Meliola gordoniae 
Meliola gorongosensis 
Meliola gouaniae 
Meliola gouaniicola 
Meliola gouldiae 
Meliola gregoriana 
Meliola grevilleae 
Meliola grevilleae-gillivrayi 
Meliola grewiae 
Meliola grewiicola 
Meliola groteana 
Meliola guamensis 
Meliola guaranitica 
Meliola guareae 
Meliola guareella 
Meliola guareicola 
Meliola guareina 
Meliola guatteriae 
Meliola guettardae 
Meliola guioae-semiglaucae 
Meliola gymnanthicola 
Meliola gymnemae 
Meliola gymnoloniae

H

Meliola hainanensis 
Meliola hamata 
Meliola hancorniae 
Meliola hannoae 
Meliola haploa 
Meliola hariotii 
Meliola harpulliicola 
Meliola harrietensis 
Meliola harrisoniae 
Meliola hawaiiensis 
Meliola hederae 
Meliola heliciae 
Meliola heliciicola 
Meliola heliconiae 
Meliola helleri 
Meliola hemidesmi 
Meliola hemidesmicola 
Meliola hendeloti 
Meliola hendrickxiana 
Meliola hendrickxii 
Meliola henryi 
Meliola hercules 
Meliola herteri 
Meliola hessii 
Meliola heterocephala 
Meliola heterodonta 
Meliola heteromeles 
Meliola heteroseta 
Meliola heterotricha 
Meliola hexaseptata 
Meliola heyneae 
Meliola hibisci 
Meliola himalayensis 
Meliola hippocrateae 
Meliola hippocrateicola 
Meliola hippomaneae 
Meliola hiratsukana 
Meliola hirsuta 
Meliola hirtellae 
Meliola hispida 
Meliola hoehneliana 
Meliola hoffmannseggiana 
Meliola holarrhenae 
Meliola holarrhenae-pubescens 
Meliola holarrhenicola 
Meliola holigarnae 
Meliola holocalicis 
Meliola homalanthi 
Meliola homalii 
Meliola homaliicola 
Meliola homalii-dolichophylli 
Meliola homonoiae 
Meliola hookeri 
Meliola hopeae 
Meliola horrida 
Meliola hosagoudarii 
Meliola hoyae 
Meliola hudsoniana 
Meliola hughesiana 
Meliola hugoniae 
Meliola hui 
Meliola hunteriae 
Meliola hurae 
Meliola hydei 
Meliola hydnocarpi 
Meliola hylodendri 
Meliola hymenocardiae 
Meliola hypodoria 
Meliola hypoestes 
Meliola hypselodelphyos 
Meliola hyptidis 
Meliola hystricis

I

Meliola icacinacearum 
Meliola ichnocarpi 
Meliola ichnocarpi 
Meliola ichnocarpi-volubili 
Meliola ilicicola 
Meliola ilicis-malabaricae 
Meliola illicii 
Meliola illigerae 
Meliola illigericola 
Meliola impatientis 
Meliola imperatae 
Meliola imperspicua 
Meliola incompta 
Meliola inconspicua 
Meliola indica 
Meliola indigofera 
Meliola inocarpi 
Meliola insignis 
Meliola integrifolii 
Meliola integripoda 
Meliola integriseta 
Meliola intermedia 
Meliola interrupta 
Meliola intricata 
Meliola invisiae 
Meliola ipomoeae 
Meliola ipomoeicola 
Meliola irosinensis 
Meliola irradians 
Meliola irvingae 
Meliola irvingiae 
Meliola isochaeta 
Meliola isothea 
Meliola italica 
Meliola ixorae 
Meliola ixorae-coccineae

J

Meliola jacaratiae 
Meliola jahnii 
Meliola jamaicensis 
Meliola janeirensis 
Meliola jasmini 
Meliola jasminicola 
Meliola jasminigena 
Meliola jasmini-sambac 
Meliola jatrophae 
Meliola javanica 
Meliola jayachandranii 
Meliola johnstonii 
Meliola juddiana 
Meliola juruana 
Meliola justiciae 
Meliola juttingii

K

Meliola kadsurae 
Meliola kagonoki 
Meliola kakachiana 
Meliola kakamegensis 
Meliola kamettiae 
Meliola kampalensis 
Meliola kanniyakumariana 
Meliola kannurensis 
Meliola kansireiensis 
Meliola kapoorii 
Meliola karamojensis 
Meliola karnatakensis 
Meliola kartaboensis 
Meliola kauaiensis 
Meliola kaveriappae 
Meliola kawakamii 
Meliola kawandensis 
Meliola keniensis 
Meliola kerichoensis 
Meliola kerniana 
Meliola kernii 
Meliola khasiensis 
Meliola khayae 
Meliola kibirae 
Meliola kigeliae 
Meliola kingiodendri 
Meliola kiraiensis 
Meliola kisantuensis 
Meliola kisubiensis 
Meliola knemae 
Meliola knemicola 
Meliola knowltoniae 
Meliola knoxiae 
Meliola knoxiicola 
Meliola knysnae 
Meliola koae 
Meliola kodaguensis 
Meliola kodaihoensis 
Meliola koelreuteriae 
Meliola koniaensis 
Meliola koriensis 
Meliola kreiseliana 
Meliola krugiodendri 
Meliola kukkeensis 
Meliola kulathupuzhaensis 
Meliola kuprensis 
Meliola kusanoi 
Meliola kweichowensis 
Meliola kydia 
Meliola kydiae-calycinae

L

Meliola laevigata 
Meliola laevipoda 
Meliola lagunensis 
Meliola lanceolatosetosa 
Meliola landolphiae 
Meliola landolphiae-floridae 
Meliola landolphiicola 
Meliola lanigera 
Meliola lanneae 
Meliola lanosa 
Meliola lantanae 
Meliola lasiacidis 
Meliola lasianthi 
Meliola laxa 
Meliola leonensis 
Meliola leopoldina 
Meliola lepianthis 
Meliola lepisanthea 
Meliola lepistemonis 
Meliola leptactiniae 
Meliola leptidea 
Meliola leptochaeta 
Meliola leptoclada 
Meliola leptogoni 
Meliola leptopus 
Meliola leptospermi 
Meliola leptospora 
Meliola leycesteriae 
Meliola lianchangensis 
Meliola lictorea 
Meliola ligustri 
Meliola linacearum 
Meliola linderae 
Meliola linhartiana 
Meliola linocierae-malabaricae 
Meliola linocieriicola 
Meliola linocierina 
Meliola lippiae 
Meliola lisianthi 
Meliola lisianthicola 
Meliola lithocarpigena 
Meliola lithocarpina 
Meliola lithraeae 
Meliola litoralis 
Meliola litseae-citrata 
Meliola litseae-citratae 
Meliola litseicola 
Meliola littoralis 
Meliola livistonae 
Meliola lobeliae 
Meliola lobeliicola 
Meliola loganiensis 
Meliola lomandrae 
Meliola lonchocarpicola 
Meliola longiappressoriata 
Meliola longiseta 
Meliola longispora 
Meliola longistipitata 
Meliola lophopetali 
Meliola lophopetaligena 
Meliola loranthacearum 
Meliola loranthi 
Meliola loropetalicola 
Meliola loxostylidis 
Meliola luculiae 
Meliola lucumae 
Meliola ludibunda 
Meliola lundiae 
Meliola luvungae 
Meliola luvungicola 
Meliola luzonensis 
Meliola lychnodisci 
Meliola lyoniae

M

Meliola mabirensis 
Meliola macalpinei 
Meliola macarangae 
Meliola macarangicola 
Meliola machili 
Meliola mackenzieae 
Meliola macracantha 
Meliola macropoda 
Meliola macrospora 
Meliola maculans 
Meliola madhucae 
Meliola maduraiensis 
Meliola maerenhoutiana 
Meliola maesae 
Meliola maesicola 
Meliola maesobotryae 
Meliola maesopsidis 
Meliola magna 
Meliola magnoliae 
Meliola mahabaleshwarensis 
Meliola mahamulkarii 
Meliola maitlandii 
Meliola makilingiana 
Meliola malabarensis 
Meliola malacotricha 
Meliola malaneae 
Meliola malangasensis 
Meliola malloti 
Meliola malouetiae 
Meliola malpighiacearum 
Meliola mammeae 
Meliola mammeicola 
Meliola mandevillae 
Meliola mandingensis 
Meliola mangiferae 
Meliola manihot 
Meliola manihoticola 
Meliola mannavanensis 
Meliola mannii 
Meliola manoasellae 
Meliola manotis 
Meliola mapaniae 
Meliola mappiae 
Meliola mappianthicola 
Meliola marantacearum 
Meliola marantae 
Meliola marantochloae 
Meliola maredumilliana 
Meliola markhamiae 
Meliola marthomaensis 
Meliola mataybae 
Meliola mattogrossensis 
Meliola maurandiae 
Meliola mauritiae 
Meliola mauritiana 
Meliola mayaguesiana 
Meliola mayepeae 
Meliola mayepeicola 
Meliola medinillae 
Meliola megalocarpa 
Meliola megalochaeta 
Meliola megalopoda 
Meliola meghalayensis 
Meliola meibomiae 
Meliola melanochaeta 
Meliola melanochylae 
Meliola melanococcae 
Meliola melanoxyli 
Meliola meliacearum 
Meliola melicopes 
Meliola meliosmae 
Meliola melochiae 
Meliola melodini 
Meliola membranacea 
Meliola memecyli 
Meliola memecylicola 
Meliola mephitidiae 
Meliola merremiae 
Meliola merrillii 
Meliola mesuae 
Meliola mezoneuri 
Meliola micheliae 
Meliola micromeli 
Meliola micromera 
Meliola micropoda 
Meliola microspora 
Meliola microthea 
Meliola microthecia 
Meliola mikaniae 
Meliola millettiae-chrysophyllae 
Meliola millettiae-racemosae 
Meliola millettiae-rhodanthae 
Meliola millettiae-sanaganae 
Meliola mimosacearum 
Meliola mimosicola 
Meliola miscantecae 
Meliola mitchellae 
Meliola mitragynae 
Meliola mitragynae-tubulosae 
Meliola mitragynicola 
Meliola mitrephorae 
Meliola modesta 
Meliola moerenhoutiana 
Meliola molfinoi 
Meliola mollinediae 
Meliola mombasana 
Meliola monanthotaxis 
Meliola monensis 
Meliola monilipes 
Meliola monilispora 
Meliola monnieriae 
Meliola monochroma 
Meliola monodorae 
Meliola monopla 
Meliola montis-fontium 
Meliola morbosa 
Meliola mori 
Meliola morrowii 
Meliola motandrae 
Meliola motatanensis 
Meliola mouensis 
Meliola mouriri 
Meliola mucunae 
Meliola mucunae-acuminatae 
Meliola mucunae-imbricatae 
Meliola mucunicola 
Meliola muhakae 
Meliola mulleri 
Meliola multiseta 
Meliola musae 
Meliola mussaendae 
Meliola mussaendae-arcuatae 
Meliola mutabilis 
Meliola mutisiae 
Meliola mycetiae 
Meliola myricae 
Meliola myricicola 
Meliola myristicacearum 
Meliola myristicae 
Meliola myrsinacearum 
Meliola myrtacearum

N

Meliola nairii 
Meliola napoleonaeae 
Meliola nashii 
Meliola neanotidis 
Meliola neelikalluensis 
Meliola negeriana 
Meliola neolitseae 
Meliola neotorta 
Meliola nepheliicola 
Meliola neurocalycis 
Meliola newbouldiae 
Meliola ngerechiana 
Meliola ngongensis 
Meliola nicaraguensis 
Meliola nidulans 
Meliola nigrorufescens 
Meliola nilgirianthi 
Meliola notabilis 
Meliola notelaeae 
Meliola nothofagi 
Meliola nothopegiae 
Meliola nyanzae

O

Meliola obtusifoliae 
Meliolaobvallata 
Meliolaochnae 
Meliolaochrocarpi 
Meliolaochthocosmi 
Meliola ochthocosmicola 
Meliola ocimincola 
Meliola ocoteicola 
Meliola octoknemae 
Meliola odontocephala 
Meliola odontochaeta 
Meliola odoratissimae 
Meliola olacicola 
Meliola olacis 
Meliola oldenlandiae 
Meliola oldenlandiicola 
Meliola oleacearum 
Meliola oleariae 
Meliola olecranonis 
Meliola oleicola 
Meliola oligomera 
Meliola oligopoda 
Meliola oncinotidis 
Meliola opaca 
Meliola ophidiochaeta 
Meliola opiliae 
Meliola opposita 
Meliola opuntiae 
Meliola orchidacearum 
Meliola ormocarpi 
Meliola ormosiae 
Meliola osmanthi 
Meliola osmanthiana 
Meliola osmanthi-aquifolii 
Meliola osmanthicola 
Meliola osmanthi-cymosi 
Meliola osmanthina 
Meliola ostodis 
Meliola ostryoderridis 
Meliola osyridicola 
Meliola osyridis 
Meliola oteroana 
Meliola otonephelii 
Meliola otophorae 
Meliola ougeiniae 
Meliola ourateae 
Meliola ouroupariae 
Meliola ovatipoda 
Meliola oxerae

P

Meliola pachychaeta 
Meliola pachystelae 
Meliola pachytricha 
Meliola palakkadensis 
Meliola palaquii 
Meliola palaquiicola 
Meliola palawanensis 
Meliola pallida 
Meliola palmicola 
Meliola pampangensis 
Meliola panamensis 
Meliola pandanacearum 
Meliola pandani 
Meliola pandanicola 
Meliola panici 
Meliola panicicola 
Meliola papayae 
Meliola papillosae 
Meliola paraensis 
Meliola paralabatiae 
Meliola paramignyae 
Meliola paraphialis 
Meliola parenchymatica 
Meliola parishiae 
Meliola paropsiae 
Meliola parreirae 
Meliola parsonsiicola 
Meliola parvifoliae 
Meliola parvula 
Meliola patella 
Meliola patens 
Meliola patileana 
Meliola patouillardii 
Meliola paucipes 
Meliola pauciseta 
Meliola paulliniae 
Meliola paulliniana 
Meliola paulliniicola 
Meliola paulliniifoliae 
Meliola payakii 
Meliola pazschkeana 
Meliola pectinata 
Meliola peddiicola 
Meliola peleae 
Meliola pelliculosa 
Meliola pellucida 
Meliola peltata 
Meliola penicillata 
Meliola pennata 
Meliola pentadis 
Meliola pentaphylacis 
Meliola pepparaensis 
Meliola pequensis 
Meliola perae 
Meliola perexigua 
Meliola pericampyli 
Meliola peringamalensis 
Meliola periplocae 
Meliola periyakanalensis 
Meliola permixta 
Meliola perpusilla 
Meliola peruiferi 
Meliola petalostigmatis 
Meliola petchii 
Meliola petiolariicola 
Meliola petiolaris 
Meliola petitiae 
Meliola petiveriae 
Meliola petraeoviticis 
Meliola phaeocephala 
Meliola phaeomaculans 
Meliola phaseoli 
Meliola philippinensis 
Meliola philodendri 
Meliola philodendricola 
Meliola phoebes 
Meliola phthirusae 
Meliola phyllanthicola 
Meliola phyllanthigena 
Meliola phyllostachydis 
Meliola physostigmatis 
Meliola phytolaccae 
Meliola phytolaccae-dioicae 
Meliola picramniae 
Meliola picrasmae 
Meliola pictetiae 
Meliola pileostegiae 
Meliola pilocarpi 
Meliola pinnatae 
Meliola piperina 
Meliola piperis 
Meliola piperis-barbati 
Meliola piptadeniae 
Meliola pisoniae 
Meliola pisoniicola 
Meliola pistaciicola 
Meliola pithecellobii 
Meliola pithecellobiicola 
Meliola pittospori 
Meliola plantaginis 
Meliola platyphyllae 
Meliola platysepali 
Meliola platysperma 
Meliola plectroniae 
Meliola pleioceratis 
Meliola pleurostyliicola 
Meliola plumbaginis 
Meliola podocarpicola 
Meliola pogostemonis 
Meliola polyalthiae 
Meliola polygoni 
Meliola polygonicola 
Meliola polyodonta 
Meliola polysciadis 
Meliola polytricha 
Meliola pomaderridis 
Meliola pomaderris 
Meliola pongamiae 
Meliola pontualii 
Meliola pottsiae 
Meliola praetervisa 
Meliola prataprajii 
Meliola premnae 
Meliola premnicola 
Meliola premnigena 
Meliola procera 
Meliola prostantherae 
Meliola protii 
Meliola protiicola 
Meliola pseudarthriae 
Meliola pseudocapensis 
Meliola pseudomori 
Meliola pseudoradiata 
Meliola pseudosasae 
Meliola pseudospondiadis 
Meliola psidii 
Meliola psidiicola 
Meliola psophocarpi 
Meliola psychotriae 
Meliola psychotriae-nudiflorae 
Meliola ptaeroxyli 
Meliola pterocarpi 
Meliola pterocarpicola 
Meliola pterocelastri 
Meliola pterospermi 
Meliola pterospermicola 
Meliola pterygotae 
Meliola pudukadensis 
Meliola puerariae 
Meliola pulchella 
Meliola pululahuensis 
Meliola pumila 
Meliola pushpangadanii 
Meliola pycnanthi 
Meliola pycnosporae 
Meliola pycnostachydis 
Meliola pygeicola

Q

Meliola quadrifurcata 
Meliola quadrispina 
Meliola queenslandica 
Meliola quercicola 
Meliola quinqueseptata

R

Meliola racemosae 
Meliola radhanagariensis 
Meliola rajamalaensis 
Meliola ramacharii 
Meliola ramicola 
Meliola ramosii 
Meliola ramulicola 
Meliola randiae 
Meliola randiae-aculeatae 
Meliola randiicola 
Meliola ranganathii 
Meliola rapaneae 
Meliola rauvolfiae 
Meliola ravii 
Meliola rechingeri 
Meliola recurvipoda 
Meliola reevesiae 
Meliola reflexa 
Meliola regiae 
Meliola rehmii 
Meliola reinkingii 
Meliola reinwardtiodendri 
Meliola reinwardtiodendricola 
Meliola remireae 
Meliola renovata 
Meliola rhamnicola 
Meliola rhodoleiicola 
Meliola rhoina 
Meliola rhois 
Meliola rickiana 
Meliola rickii 
Meliola rigida 
Meliola ripogoni 
Meliola rizalensis 
Meliola robinsonii 
Meliola rockstonensis 
Meliola roureae 
Meliola rubi 
Meliola rubiacearum 
Meliola rubicola 
Meliola rubiella 
Meliola rubifolii 
Meliola rudolphiae

S

Meliola sabiceae 
Meliola saccardoi 
Meliola sacchari 
Meliola sairandhriana 
Meliola sakawensis 
Meliola salaciae 
Meliola salaciicola 
Meliola salleana 
Meliola samaderae 
Meliola samarensis 
Meliola sambuci 
Meliola samydae 
Meliola sandwicensis 
Meliola sanjappae 
Meliola sansevieriae 
Meliola santalacearum 
Meliola sapiicola 
Meliola sapindacearum 
Meliola sapindi 
Meliola sapindi-esculenti 
Meliola sapotacearum 
Meliola sarcostigmaticola 
Meliola sarcostigmatis 
Meliola saurauiae 
Meliola sauropicola 
Meliola savarkarii 
Meliola sawadae 
Meliola scabriseta 
Meliola scaevolae 
Meliola schefflerae 
Meliola schimae 
Meliola schimicola 
Meliola schimigena 
Meliola schizolobii 
Meliola schlechterinae 
Meliola schoepfiae 
Meliola schwarzii 
Meliola schwenckiicola 
Meliola sclerochitonis 
Meliola sclerolobii 
Meliola scleropyri 
Meliola scolopiae 
Meliola scolopoliicola 
Meliola scott-elliotii 
Meliola scutiae 
Meliola scytopetali 
Meliola secamones 
Meliola securidacicola 
Meliola semecarpi 
Meliola semecarpi-anacardii 
Meliola semecarpicola 
Meliola sempeiensis 
Meliola serdangensis 
Meliola serjaniae 
Meliola serjaniicola 
Meliola sersalisiae 
Meliola sesami 
Meliola setariae 
Meliola shettyi 
Meliola shiiae 
Meliola shillongensis 
Meliola shimbaensis 
Meliola shivarajui 
Meliola sideroxyli 
Meliola sideroxylicola 
Meliola silentvalleyensis 
Meliola simaoensis 
Meliola simillima 
Meliola singaporensis 
Meliola sinuosa 
Meliola siparunae 
Meliola smallii 
Meliola smeathmanniae 
Meliola smilacacearum 
Meliola smilacis 
Meliola snowdenii 
Meliola solteroi 
Meliola sordidula 
Meliola sorindeiae 
Meliola soroceae 
Meliola soroceana 
Meliola sparsipoda 
Meliola spartinae 
Meliola spegazziniana 
Meliola sphaeropoda 
Meliola spigeliae 
Meliola spinigera 
Meliola spirobelia 
Meliola standleyi 
Meliola staphyleacearum 
Meliola stemonae 
Meliola stemonuri 
Meliola stenocarpi 
Meliola stenospora 
Meliola stenotaphri 
Meliola stephaniae 
Meliola sterculiacearum 
Meliola sterculiae 
Meliola sterculiicola 
Meliola stevensiana 
Meliola stevensii 
Meliola stixis 
Meliola stizolobii 
Meliola straussiae 
Meliola strebli 
Meliola strobilanthicola 
Meliola strombosiicola 
Meliola strombosiigena 
Meliola strophanthicola 
Meliola strychnacearum 
Meliola strychni 
Meliola strychnicola 
Meliola strychnigena 
Meliola strychni-multiflorae 
Meliola strychni-nux-vomicae 
Meliola styracearum 
Meliola styracina 
Meliola styracis 
Meliola subdentata 
Meliola subpellucida 
Meliola subramanyaensis 
Meliola substenospora 
Meliola subtortuosa 
Meliola sudanensis 
Meliola suisyaensis 
Meliola surattensis 
Meliola suttonii 
Meliola sweetiae 
Meliola swieteniae 
Meliola swieteniicola 
Meliola sydowiana 
Meliola sydowii 
Meliola symingtoniae 
Meliola symphorematicola 
Meliola symphorematis 
Meliola symplocacearum 
Meliola symploci 
Meliola symplocicola 
Meliola syzygii-benthamiani 
Meliola syzygiigena

T

Meliola tabernaemontanae 
Meliola tabernaemontanicola 
Meliola tahitensis 
Meliola taitensis 
Meliola taityuensis 
Meliola taiwaniana 
Meliola talaumae 
Meliola talisiana 
Meliola tamarindi 
Meliola tanakaeana 
Meliola tapirirae 
Meliola tapiriricola 
Meliola tapisciicola 
Meliola tawaoensis 
Meliola tayabensis 
Meliola tecleae 
Meliola tecomae 
Meliola tectonae 
Meliola teke 
Meliola telensis 
Meliola telosmae 
Meliola tenella 
Meliola teramni 
Meliola teramni 
Meliola teramnicola 
Meliola terecitensis 
Meliola ternstroemiicola 
Meliola tetracerae 
Meliola tetradeniae 
Meliola tetrorchidiicola 
Meliola thailandicum 
Meliola thalliformis 
Meliola thaxteri 
Meliola theacearum 
Meliola theissenii 
Meliola themedae 
Meliola themedicola 
Meliola theobromae 
Meliola thirumalacharii 
Meliola thiruvananthapurica 
Meliola thiteana 
Meliola thitei 
Meliola thiyagesanii 
Meliola thollonis 
Meliola thomandersiae 
Meliola thomasiana 
Meliola thouiniae 
Meliola thuemeniana 
Meliola thunbergiae 
Meliola thunbergiicola 
Meliola thwaitesiana 
Meliola tibigirica 
Meliola tieghemopanacis 
Meliola tijucensis 
Meliola tinctoriae 
Meliola tinomisciicola 
Meliola toddaliae 
Meliola toddaliicola 
Meliola togoensis 
Meliola tonduzii 
Meliola toonae 
Meliola toreniae 
Meliola torricelliae 
Meliola torulipes 
Meliola torulosiseta 
Meliola torulosispora 
Meliola tounateae 
Meliola toxocarpi 
Meliola trachelospermi 
Meliola tragiae 
Meliola transvaalensis 
Meliola travancoricae 
Meliola trewiae 
Meliola tricalysiae 
Meliola trichiliae 
Meliola trichiliicola 
Meliola trichocarpa 
Meliola trichoscyphae 
Meliola trichostroma 
Meliola tridentata 
Meliola trifurcata 
Meliola trilepisii 
Meliola trinidadensis 
Meliola triplochitonis 
Meliola trujillensis 
Meliola tumatumariensis 
Meliola tumor 
Meliola tungurahuana 
Meliola tunkiaensis 
Meliola turraeae 
Meliola tylophorae 
Meliola tylophorae-indicae

U

Meliola ugandensis 
Meliola uleana 
Meliola ulei 
Meliola uncariicola 
Meliola uncinata 
Meliola uncitricha 
Meliola unonae 
Meliola unonicola 
Meliola urariae 
Meliola urceolae 
Meliola usteriae 
Meliola uvariicola

V

Meliola vaccinii 
Meliola vanderystii 
Meliola varia 
Meliola variaseta 
Meliola varicuspis 
Meliola vazhachalensis 
Meliola velutina 
Meliola venezuelana 
Meliola ventilaginicola 
Meliola ventilaginis 
Meliola vepridis 
Meliola verbenacearum 
Meliola vernalis 
Meliola viburnicola 
Meliola vicina 
Meliola vicosensis 
Meliola vignae-gracilis 
Meliola villaresiae 
Meliola villaresiana 
Meliola villaresiicola 
Meliola visci 
Meliola viticicola 
Meliola viticis-pinnatae 
Meliola viticola 
Meliola vitis 
Meliola vittalii 
Meliola vivekananthanii 
Meliola voacangae 
Meliola voacangae-foetidae 
Meliola voacangicola

W

Meliola wainioi 
Meliola walsurae 
Meliola walsuricola 
Meliola warburgiae 
Meliola wardii 
Meliola warneckei 
Meliola weberae 
Meliola weigeltii 
Meliola wendlandiae 
Meliola wenshanensis 
Meliola whetzelii 
Meliola wikstroemiicola 
Meliola willoughbyae 
Meliola wismarensis 
Meliola woodfordiae 
Meliola woodiana 
Meliola wormiae 
Meliola wrightiae

X Y Z

Meliola xenoderma 
Meliola xumenensis 
Meliola xylopiae 
Meliola xylopiae-sericeae 
Meliola xylosmae 
Meliola xylosmae-buxifoliae 
Meliola xylosmicola 
Meliola yangambiensis 
Meliola yaquensis 
Meliola yatesiana 
Meliola yuanjiangensis 
Meliola yunnanensis 
Meliola zambalesica 
Meliola zamboagensis 
Meliola zangii 
Meliola zanthoxyli 
Meliola zanthoxyli-ovalifolii 
Meliola zetekii 
Meliola zigzac 
Meliola ziziphi 
Meliola zollingeri

References

External links

Meliola
Meliolaceae